Alteveer can refer to several location in the Netherlands:
Alteveer, Groningen
Alteveer, De Wolden, Drenthe
Alteveer, Noordenveld, Drenthe
Alteveer, Gelderland
Alteveer, Overijssel